Phaedropsis leialis is a moth in the family Crambidae. It was described by Paul Dognin in 1906. It is found in Paraguay, San Salvador, Panama, Costa Rica and Belize.

References

Moths described in 1906
Spilomelinae